Audun Hugleiksson (Hestakorn) ( 1240 –  2 December 1302) was a Norwegian nobleman at the end of the 13th century. He was the king's right hand, both under King Magnus Lagabøte and King Eirik Magnusson. He  was seen as an important politician and lawman in his time and played a central role in reforming the Norwegian law system.

Biography
Audun Hugleiksson grew up on the farm Hegranes on Ålhus in Jølster which lies in what was the area of Firdafylke, (east of Førde and north of the Sognefjord). His father Hugleik seems to have been a lower nobleman and a member of King Håkon Håkonsson's hird (1204–1263).  His father had the byname Hestakorn because he fed his horses with grain, something the local people saw as extravagant and a waste of a good food source. Hugleik himself probably did not himself have a very prominent position, but was still married to a woman of high standing from the east of Norway. Audun's mother was most likely the daughter of Audun i Borg (now  Sarpsborg). Audun could then have traced a common lineage to Inga of Varteig (1185–1234), mother of King Håkon Håkonsson. 

Audun Hugleiksson was initially taught  at the Bergen Cathedral School. His education was continued in Paris, France and Bologna, Italy. Upon his return to Norway, he was engaged in the revisions which resulted in Magnus Lagabøte's national law (Magnus Lagabøtes landslov). From 1280 and onwards he was given increasingly important roles in the government of Norway and its foreign policy. He had his own seat on the king's council, was a lawyer (stallare), tax minister (fehirde) and held the title of a baron.  

Between 1276 and 1286,  Audun Hugleiksson erected a castle or fortress called Audunborg on Ålhus in Jølster in Sunnfjord. 

Audun Hugleiksson was executed during the reign of King Haakon V of Norway. After 1295 Audun seems to have played a less important role in the Norwegian Council. But he remained in his position as a treasurer. In July 1299, King Eirik Magnusson died and immediately succeeded by his younger brother, King Haakon V. During August 1299, Audun Hugleiksson was arrested. He was imprisoned for three years until he was sentenced to death.  All his properties were seized and placed under the king. He was hanged at Nordnes in Bergen on Sunday 2 December 1302.

References

Related Literature
Nedrebø, Yngve (2002) Audun Hugleiksson – frå kongens råd til galgen (Førde: Selja forlag) 
Knut Helle. «Audun Hugleiksson». I: Norsk biografisk leksikon, bd 1. 2. utg. 1999 (Med fyldig litteraturliste)

External links
 Audun Hugleiksson Hestakorn(Statsarkivet i Bergen) 

1240s births
1302 deaths
People from Jølster 
People educated at the Bergen Cathedral School
Norwegian barons
Executed Norwegian people
Lèse majesté in Norway
People executed by Norway by hanging
14th-century executions by Norway
13th-century Norwegian nobility
14th-century Norwegian nobility